Shelley Olds (born September 30, 1980) is an American former professional racing cyclist.

Career
Olds was born and raised in Groton, Massachusetts. She studied health and human performance at Roanoke College in Virginia, and was captain of their women's soccer team. A star on the soccer pitch, Olds was a two-time NSCAA All-South Region selection, four-time All-ODAC selection and the 2002 ODAC Player of the Year. She was inducted into the Roanoke Athletic Hall of Fame in 2016.

After college, she moved to California and was introduced to cycling by Rob Evans, whom she later married. She started racing locally on the road, quickly moving up in the ranks and winning the Road Cycling State Championships. She then joined Peanut Butter & Co.TWENTY12 team, won the Track National Scratch Race Championships in 2008 and 2009 and then won the National Criterium Championships in 2010 and 2011. She began racing internationally soon after and earned podium results in the Tour of New Zealand, Trofeo Costa Etrusca Iii in Italy, Drentse 8 Van Dwingeloo in Netherlands, as well as Liberty Classic road race in Philadelphia. She registered with the UCI under her married name of Shelley Evans for the 2010 season, but reverted to her maiden name in later seasons.

In 2012, Olds signed with Dutch team  and won the Tour of Chongming Island World Cup to earn a qualifying spot on the US National team for the Road race at the London Olympics. After a tire change, she caught back up to the peloton and finished in 7th place.

Olds carried on with her professional racing career with multiple UCI Women teams, and continued her ascent to become one of the top sprinters in the world. She took multiple Sprinters' jerseys in races across Italy, Norway and China. Back in North America, she won the Winston-Salem Cycling Classic in North Carolina, the Grand Prix Cycliste de Gatineau in Quebec, Canada, and the White Spot/Delta road race in British Columbia, Canada. 

In 2015, while riding for the Italian  team, Olds won the inaugural edition of La Madrid Challenge by La Vuelta in a bunch sprint beating out top sprinters in the world at the time. She moved back to the United States in 2016 to join  team and started the year with a 2nd place finish in the Women's Down Under Tour in Australia, but had to retire in March of that year after crashing and suffering from head injuries in back to back races in Europe.

Major results
Sources:

2008
 1st  Scratch, National Track Championships
 8th Liberty Classic
2009
 1st  Scratch, National Track Championships
 2009–10 UCI Track Cycling World Cup Classics
2nd  Points race, Melbourne
3rd  Scratch, Manchester
 3rd  Points race, 2008–09 UCI Track Cycling World Cup Classics, Copenhagen
 3rd Liberty Classic
2010
 1st  Road race, Pan American Road Championships
 1st  National Criterium Championships
 1st Overall Women's Tour of New Zealand
1st Stages 1, 2, 5 & 6
 1st Stage 10 Giro d'Italia Femminile
 2nd Liberty Classic
2011
 1st GP Costa Etrusca
 2nd Drentse 8 van Dwingeloo
 2nd Liberty Classic
 5th Trofeo Alfredo Binda-Comune di Cittiglio
 6th Grand Prix de Dottignies
2012
 Tour of Chongming Island
1st World Cup
4th Overall Stage race
 1st Stage 6 Giro d'Italia Femminile
 2nd 7-Dorpenomloop Aalburg
 4th Road race, Pan American Road Championships
 4th Open de Suède Vårgårda
 7th Road race, Summer Olympics
 8th Holland Hills Classic
2013
 1st Grand Prix cycliste de Gatineau
 2nd Le Samyn des Dames
 2nd Omloop van het Hageland
 4th Drentse 8 van Dwingeloo
 4th Philadelphia Cycling Classic
 5th Overall Belgium Tour
 5th Overall Giro della Toscana Int. Femminile – Memorial Michela Fanini
1st Points classification
 5th Omloop Het Nieuwsblad
 5th Cholet Pays de Loire Dames
 6th Ronde van Drenthe World Cup
 7th Chrono Gatineau
 8th Overall Tour of Chongming Island
2014
 1st  Overall Giro della Toscana Int. Femminile — Memorial Michela Fanini
1st  Points classification
1st Prologue & Stage 1
 1st GP Comune di Cornaredo
 1st Winston-Salem Cycling Classic
 2nd Overall Tour of Chongming Island
 2nd Novilon EDR Cup
 2nd Grand Prix de Dottignies
 3rd Overall Festival Luxembourgeois du cyclisme féminin Elsy Jacobs
 3rd Ronde van Drenthe World Cup
 5th La Course by Le Tour de France
 6th Road race, UCI Road World Championships
 6th Tour of Chongming Island World Cup
 8th Overall Vuelta Internacional Femenina a Costa Rica
1st Stages 3 & 5
 10th Sparkassen Giro
2015
 1st White Spot / Delta Road Race
 1st La Madrid Challenge by La Vuelta
 2nd Overall Ladies Tour of Norway
1st  Points classification
1st Stage 2
 2nd EPZ Omloop van Borsele
 Tour of Chongming Island
4th World Cup
5th Overall Stage race
 4th Philadelphia Cycling Classic
 7th Dwars door de Westhoek
 9th Crescent Women World Cup Vårgårda
2016
 2nd Overall Women's Tour Down Under
 4th Omloop van het Hageland
 5th Omloop Het Nieuwsblad
 6th Ronde van Drenthe

References

Further reading

External links

1980 births
Living people
American female cyclists
People from Groton, Massachusetts
Sportspeople from Middlesex County, Massachusetts
Roanoke College alumni
Cyclists at the 2012 Summer Olympics
Olympic cyclists of the United States
21st-century American women
Cyclists from Massachusetts